Alexander Latta (1 September 1867 – 25 August 1928) was a Scottish footballer who made ten appearances, mostly at outside right, in Everton's Football League title winning side of 1890–91. Latta began his career with Dumbarton Athletic as a 14-year-old but moved to Everton in 1889. He was a tall and stocky outside right who displayed great pace and dribbling skills.

Latta played twice for Scotland during his career. His debut came in the 5–1 defeat of Wales on 10 March 1888, in which he scored twice; he was the only serving player from Dumbarton Athletic (not to be confused with Dumbarton) to have been selected for international duty.

References

External links 

London Hearts profile

1867 births
1928 deaths
Scottish footballers
Scotland international footballers
Everton F.C. players
Liverpool F.C. players
Association football wingers
English Football League players
Sportspeople from Dumbarton
Footballers from West Dunbartonshire
Place of death missing
FA Cup Final players